The Laguna 18 is an American trailerable sailboat that was designed by W. Shad Turner as a cruiser and daysailer, and first built in 1983.

The Laguna 18 is a development of the Windrose 5.5.

Production
The design was built by Laguna Yachts in the United States, between 1983 and 1987, but it is now out of production.

Design
The Laguna 18 is a recreational keelboat, built predominantly of fiberglass, with wood trim. It has a fractional sloop rig, a raked stem, a plumb transom, a transom-hung rudder controlled by a tiller and a fixed fin keel. It displaces  and carries  of ballast.

An open cockpit version was also produced for daysailing.

The design has sleeping accommodation for four people, with a double "V"-berth in the bow cabin and two aft quarter berths under the cockpit.

See also
List of sailing boat types

References

Keelboats
1980s sailboat type designs
Sailing yachts
Trailer sailers
Sailboat type designs by W. Shad Turner
Sailboat types built by Laguna Yachts